Rashad Sadygov (born 16 June 1982) is an Azerbaijani football manager and former player who manages Zira FK. He played as a centre-back.

Sadigov is the most capped player in the history of Azerbaijan national team with 111 games  and captained the team since 2004 and he is widely recognized as one of the strongest players in the history of independent Azerbaijan, as he won the national league title six times and was selected as the footballer of the year six times. He played in UEFA Europa League  and UEFA Champions League for FK Qarabağ.

Early life
Sadigov began playing football during his school years at Vagif Pashayev-led Youth Football Sports School at the age of 10. He also spent time playing football for the clubs Sharur, the Air Force team, and Real Baku, all of which are based in Baku.

Club career

In 2000, Sadigov signed his first professional contract with PFK Turan Tovuz, but played only nine games. At that time, he also played for the Azerbaijan Under-21 football team. At the end of the 2000/01 season, the defender was transferred to PFC Neftchi.

He played for Foolad F.C. in Iran's Premier Football League in 2002. After his comeback to  Neftchi, Rashad won the national championship and cup and succeeded in passing the first qualification round of the Champions League with the black-and-whites. He played 8 games in European cups for Neftchi (two in the UEFA Cup qualifying during the 2001–02 season, two in the UEFA Champions League qualifying rounds in the 2004–05, and four appearances during the 2005–06 season of the same competition).

He traveled to Turkey to play for Kayserispor for the 2005–06 season. He was loaned back to Neftchi in January 2006. He played once at the start of 2006/07 season, but planned to go back with Neftchi, again. Sadigov failed to notice that the Association of Football Federations of Azerbaijan had changed the deadline of the transfer window, so he changed to play basketball to keep his fitness.

On 23 January 2009, Sadygov returned to the Turkish Süper Lig to join Kocaelispor on a six-month contract after he was kicked out from PFC Neftchi by the head coach Hans-Jürgen Gede in December 2008. Rashad made his debut for Kocaelispor in their 4–0 victory over Hacettepe on 25 January 2009.

In July 2009, Sadigov briefly returned to FK Qarabağ to help them in UEFA Europa League and scored a magnificent goal against Rosenborg BK. He also scored against FC Honka after delivering a powerful free kick. As a result, he signed a one-year contract with Karabakh, after the club's impressive performance in the UEFA Europa League.

In August 2010, he signed a 2-year contract with Turkish Super Lig outfit Eskişehirspor. However, following a string of injuries, he failed to get a regular place in Eskişehirspor's defence, which caused him to seek a new club.

After being heavily linked with a move back to FK Qarabağ, Sadigov joined Qarabağ on 11 February 2011. He helped his team to qualify for UEFA Europa League and UEFA Champions League. He played 5 times in UEFA Europa League group stages and one time in the UEFA Champions League group stage.

On 21 June 2020, Sadigov announced his retirement.

International career
Sadigov made his Azerbaijan debut on 6 October 2001, against Sweden during 2002 FIFA World Cup qualification (UEFA). Sadigov was Azerbaijan's vice-captain under Carlos Alberto Torres, deputising in the absence of regular captain Gurban Gurbanov, but following the retirement of Gurban Gurbanov from football, Sadygov was named as full-time captain in March 2004. Sadigov is the most capped Azerbaijani player of all time.

Managerial career
On 13 December 2017, Sadigov was appointed as manager of Azerbaijan U21.

On 17 July 2020, Sadigov was announced as Zira's new manager on a three-year contract.

Personal life
In 2006, as a result of missing the registration deadline for the Azerbaijani football club side Neftchi Baku, Sadigov played basketball for local club BK NTD.

Sadigov was one of the favorite players among Kocaelispor supporters and nicknamed "Terminator" by local media. He also featured as one of the official faces for Azerbaijan Premier League promotion campaign in 2010.

Career statistics

Club

International

Scores and results list Azerbaijan's goal tally first, score column indicates score after each Sadygov goal.

Honours

As player
Neftchi Baku
Azerbaijan Premier League: 2003–04, 2004–05
Azerbaijan Cup: 2001–02, 2003–04

Kayserispor
UEFA Intertoto Cup: 2006

Qarabağ
Azerbaijan Premier League: 2013–14, 2014–15, 2015–16, 2016–17,  2017–18, 2018–19, 2019–20
Azerbaijan Cup: 2014-15, 2015-16, 2016–17

Individual
Azerbaijani Footballer of the Year: 2004, 2005, 2010, 2013, 2016, 2017

As manager
Zira
Azerbaijan Cup: 2021–22 runners-up

See also
 List of men's footballers with 100 or more international caps

References

External links

 Qarabağ FK profile
 
 

1982 births
Living people
Footballers from Baku
Association football defenders
Azerbaijani footballers
Azerbaijan youth international footballers
Azerbaijan under-21 international footballers
Azerbaijan international footballers
Azerbaijani expatriate footballers
Azerbaijani football managers
Azerbaijan Premier League players
Persian Gulf Pro League players
Süper Lig players
Turan-Tovuz IK players
Neftçi PFK players
Foolad FC players
Kayserispor footballers
Kocaelispor footballers
Eskişehirspor footballers
Qarabağ FK players
Expatriate footballers in Turkey
Azerbaijani expatriate sportspeople in Turkey
Expatriate footballers in Iran
FIFA Century Club